Boolathana is a genus of spiders in the family Trachycosmidae found in western Australia. There are two species in the genus, Boolathana mainae and Boolathana spiralis. It is named after Boolathana Station, a pastoral lease near where the first specimen was found.

References

Trochanteriidae
Spiders of Australia
Araneomorphae genera